Hilton Diagonal Mar Barcelona is a skyscraper and hotel in Barcelona, Catalonia, Spain. Completed in 2004, has 25 floors and rises 85 metres. It is part of Hilton Hotels. Lies on Passeig del Taulat street 262–264. In the beginning of 2019, the hotel completed an extensive renovation program.

See also 
 List of tallest buildings and structures in Barcelona

Curiosity 
In Barcelona exists another Hilton Barcelona, built in 1990, on Avinguda Diagonal 589.

External links 

 Official page of Hilton Diagonal Mar Barcelona

References 

Skyscraper hotels in Barcelona
Hotel buildings completed in 2004
Barcelona